The CPA National Training Centre was a communist training camp and assembly operated by the Communist Party of Australia (CPA) from 1958 until the party's dissolution in 1991.

History 
Located in Minto, NSW, the camp operated under the front of the "Bushlovers' Club". The camp initially attracted controversy on the tail of the second red scare wave, being described as a "brainwashing" institution by the National President of the RSL and connected to various industrial agitations. Over its lifetime, Eric Aarons served as the school principal and was a key figure in its formation and operation.

Activities 
Up until the 1980s part of the site's function was as a school in Marxist thought, economics, and their relation to Australian politics.  During this period, and for the remainder of its life, the site also functioned as an assembly grounds where seminars on gay rights, feminism, and Indigenous Australian autonomy were held.

This association with Indigenous land rights movement led the National Party and the League of Rights to portray Indigenous Australian sovereignty as a communist conspiracy to establish a Marxist state within Australia. This, largely discredited, theory was first advanced by a book written by a former member of the CPA, which saw minor success as a result of this publicity but drew heavy criticism from Jewish groups over its antisemitic publisher and its association with racist, antisemitic organisations.

References 

1958 establishments in Australia
1991 disestablishments in Australia
Communist Party of Australia
Far-left politics in Australia